Chris Bianco is an American James Beard Award-winning chef and restaurateur in Phoenix, Arizona. He operates restaurants in Arizona and California.

Early life 
Bianco was born in the Bronx in 1960, and grew up in Ossining, New York.  He had asthma as a child, forcing him to stay inside, where he watched his aunt cook. At age 13 he began working at a local pizzeria. In 1985, he won two plane tickets anywhere in the United States and, on a whim, chose to go to Phoenix.  When he got there, he felt connected to the place. Bianco took chef's jobs in Italy and Santa Fe, N.M, and returned to Phoenix in 1993.

Culinary career 
Bianco began making mozzarella in his apartment and selling it to Italian restaurants.  Later, Guy Coscos, a specialty grocer in Phoenix offered him the opportunity to make and sell pizzas in the corner of his store. Bianco's pizza was popular and he realized he could make pizza for a living.  

Bianco opened Pizzeria Bianco with business partner Susan Pool, in 1993. In 1996, the restaurant moved to 623 East Adams Street, the historic site of Baird Machine Shop in Heritage Square.  

In 2010, Bianco was hospitalized due to a severe asthma attack and pneumonia.  The reason was years of exposure to airborne flour and smoke from making pizza, which caused him to pivot away from pizza-only restaurants and toward pasta. Bianco also operates Bar Bianco, Tratto, and Pane Bianco, located in Midtown Phoenix.

In September 2022, Bianco was featured in the Netflix documentary series Chef's Table: Pizza.

Awards 
Bianco's first James Beard Award nomination was in 2000, and he won the James Beard Award in 2003, when he was the first pizzaiolo to be named Best Chef Southwest.

In 2022, Bianco was named Outstanding Restaurateur by the James Beard Foundation, the industry’s highest award.

References

External links 
 

Year of birth missing (living people)
Living people
American chefs
American male chefs
James Beard Foundation Award winners
Chefs from New York City
People from the Bronx
People from Phoenix, Arizona
Chefs from Arizona